Walter Melon may refer to:

 The English-language version of the cartoon character Achille Talon
 Walter Melon (TV series), the English-language TV series based on the character
 The main villain from Aqua Teen Hunger Force Colon Movie Film for Theaters